Thymidine (symbol dT or dThd), also known as deoxythymidine,  deoxyribosylthymine, or thymine deoxyriboside, is a pyrimidine deoxynucleoside.  Deoxythymidine is the DNA nucleoside T, which pairs with deoxyadenosine (A) in double-stranded DNA. In cell biology it is used to synchronize the cells in G1/early S phase. 
The prefix deoxy- is often left out since there are no precursors of thymine nucleotides involved in RNA synthesis.

Before the boom in thymidine use caused by the need for thymidine in the production of the antiretroviral drug azidothymidine (AZT), much of the world's thymidine production came from herring sperm. Thymidine occurs almost exclusively in DNA but it also occurs in the T-loop of tRNA.

Structure and properties
In its composition, deoxythymidine is a nucleoside composed of deoxyribose (a pentose sugar) joined to the pyrimidine base thymine.

Deoxythymidine can be phosphorylated with one, two or three phosphoric acid groups, creating dTMP (deoxythymidine monophosphate), dTDP, or dTTP (for the di- and tri- phosphates, respectively).

It exists in solid form as small white crystals or white crystalline powder. It has a molecular weight of 242.229 u and a melting point of 185 °C. The stability of deoxythymidine under standard temperature and pressure (STP) is very high.

Deoxythymidine is non-toxic and as part of one of the four nucleosides in DNA it is a naturally occurring compound that exists in all living organisms and DNA viruses. Instead of thymidine, RNA contains uridine (uracil joined to ribose). Uracil is chemically very similar to thymine, which is also known as 5-methyluracil. Since thymine nucleotides are precursors of DNA (but not RNA), the prefix "deoxy" is often left out, i.e., deoxythymidine is often just called thymidine.

Thymidine is listed as a chemical teratogen.

Modified analogs

Iododeoxyuridine is a radiosensitizer and increases the amount of DNA damage received from ionizing radiation.

Azidothymidine (AZT) – used in the treatment of HIV infection.  AZT inhibits the process of reverse transcription, a critical step in the viral life cycle.

Radiolabeled thymidine (TdR), such as tritiated thymidine (3H-TdR), is commonly used in cell proliferation assays. The thymidine is incorporated into dividing cells and the level of this incorporation, measured using a liquid scintillation counter, is proportional to the amount of cell proliferation. For example, lymphocyte proliferation can be measured this way in lymphoproliferative disorders.

Bromodeoxyuridine (BrdU) is another thymidine analog that is often used for the detection of proliferating cells in living tissues.

5-Ethynyl-2´-deoxyuridine (EdU) is a thymidine analog which is incorporated into the DNA of dividing cells and is used to assay DNA synthesis in cell culture or living tissues. It can be visualized by covalently binding a fluorescent azide using click chemistry, which is less harsh than the conditions used to expose the epitope for BrdU antibodies.

Edoxudine is an antiviral drug.

Telbivudine (β-L-2'-deoxythymidine, LdT) is the unmodified "unnatural" L-enantiomer of thymidine that was used in the treatment of chronic hepatitis B.

Thymidine imbalance induces mutation and recombination
During growth of bacteriophage T4, an excess of thymidine availability increases mutation.  A deficiency of thymidine during growth also increases mutation.  A thymidylate auxotroph of the diploid yeast Saccharomyces cerevisiae was grown under conditions in which thymidyate levels varied from excess to depletion.  High levels of thymidylate were observed to be mutagenic and recombinogenic, whereas starvation for thymidylate was recombinogenic but only slightly mutagenic.

References

External links
 http://money.cnn.com/magazines/fortune/fortune_archive/1990/11/05/74308/index.htm

Nucleosides
Pyrimidinediones
Hydroxymethyl compounds